State Trunk Highway 180 (often called Highway 180, STH-180 or WIS 180) is a , north–south state highway in southeastern Marinette County, Wisconsin, United States, that runs from Wisconsin Highway 64 (WIS 64) in Marinette to U.S. Route 141 (US 141) in Wausaukee.

Route description
WIS 180 begins at a roundabout on WIS 64 (Hall Avenue) on the northwestern city limits of Marinette. The road continues south as County Trunk Highway T (CTH-T/Roosevelt Road) to connect with U.S. Route 41 (US 41) and then on to end at CTH-B. WIS 64 heads east to end at US 41 in central Marinette and heads west to connect with US 141 and then on to Pound and Antigo. For its entire length, the WIS 180 roughly follows the western bank of the Menominee River as a two-lane road. The river in the area of WIS 180 flows along the stateline between Wisconsin and Michigan.

From is southern terminus WIS 180 heads north along the western city limits line of Marinette as Roosevelt Avenue for about  before turning northeasterly to leave the city. After promptly crossing a bridge over the Wright Slough of the Menominee River, WIS 180 continues its northeasterly course for about  before reaching the eastern end of CTH-G in the unincorporated community of Rubys Corner. CTH-G heads west to Walsh and Loomis. Continuing northerly for about another , WIS 180 passes through the unincorporated community of Miles. About  farther along its route WIS 180 connects with the eastern end of CTH-X on the southeast corner of Menominee River County Park. CTH-X heads west to Goll and US 141 in Middle Inlnet. Approximately  later, WIS 180 enters the unincorporated community of McAllister.

Shortly after entering McAllister, WIS 180 curves to head west. Near the end of that curve the highway connects with the eastern end of CTH-JJ at a T intersection. CTH-JJ heads due east to cross the Menominee River, and enter Michigan, on its way toward Wallace, Michigan. WIS 180 then connects with the southern end of CTH-RR, almost immediately after its junction with CTH-JJ. CTH-RR heads northerly to pass through Packard before also crossing the Menominee River [and entering Michigan] on its way toward Koss, Michigan.

From McAllister, WIS 180 heads westerly for about  until it reaches its northern terminus at US 141 on the southern border of the village of Wausaukee. The road continues west as 1st Street over a double set of railroad tracks to end at 1st Road. US 141 heads north through Wausaukee to Amberg, Pembine, and Niagara. US 141 heads south to Crivitz, Pound, and Green Bay.

History
In 1948 a section of County Trunk Highway C was designated as WIS 180. Since its establishment the highway has only had two significant changes. First, several of the sharper curves along the route have been "softened". Second, the routing of the southern end (within Marinette) was moved from Riverside Avenue to the current Roosevelt Avenue.

Major intersections

See also

References

External links

180
Transportation in Marinette County, Wisconsin